The County Asylums Act 1808 formed mental health law in England and Wales from 1808 to 1845. Notably, the Asylums Act established public mental asylums in Britain that could be operated by the county government. It permitted, but did not compel, Justices of the Peace to provide establishments for the care of pauper lunatics, so that they could be removed from workhouses and prisons.

The Act is also known as Mr. Wynn's Act, after Charles Watkin Williams-Wynn, a Welsh member of parliament for Montgomeryshire, who promoted the act.

See also 
County Asylums Act 1828
County Asylums Act 1845
List of asylums commissioned in England and Wales

References 

1808 in British law
United Kingdom Acts of Parliament 1808
Acts of the Parliament of the United Kingdom concerning England and Wales
Legal history of England
Mental health legal history of the United Kingdom